University Heights Academy (University Heights or UHA) is an independent, college preparatory school for students in pre-kindergarten through 12th grade located in Hopkinsville, Kentucky.  The school was founded in 1973 and currently has an enrollment of over 300 in grades K-12.  The school also includes a day care center, an all-weather track, a softball field, a baseball field, a soccer field, walking trails, a pond and stream, an astronomy pad, and an activity building/gymnasium. The school's mascot is the Blazer.

Successful alumni include Steve Gorman, drummer for The Black Crowes.

See also
 Hopkinsville
 Christian County
 Private school
 Christian County High School
 Hopkinsville High School
 Heritage Christian Academy

References

External links
 University Heights Academy
 Independent Schools Association of the Central States
 Hopkinsville, Kentucky
 Kentucky High School Athletic Association

Educational institutions established in 1973
Private elementary schools in Kentucky
Private high schools in Kentucky
Private middle schools in Kentucky
Schools in Christian County, Kentucky
Preparatory schools in Kentucky
Hopkinsville, Kentucky